The 1987 Taipei Women's Championships was a women's tennis tournament played on indoor carpet courts in Taipei, Taiwan and was part of the Category 1 tier of the 1987 Virginia Slims World Championship Series. It was the second edition of the tournament and was held from 20 April through 26 April 1987. Third-seeded Anne Minter won the singles title.

Finals

Singles
 Anne Minter defeated  Claudia Porwik 6–4, 6–1
 It was Minter's first singles title of her career.

Doubles
 Cammy MacGregor /  Cynthia MacGregor defeated  Sandy Collins /  Sharon Walsh 7–6(10–8), 5–7, 6–4
 It was Cammy MacGregor's first doubles title of her career. It was Cynthia MacGregor's first doubles title of her career.

References

External links
 ITF tournament edition details
 Tournament draws

Taipei Women's Championship
Taipei Women's Championship
1987 in Taiwanese tennis